This is a list of the moths of family Saturniidae which are found in Chile. It also acts as an index to the species articles and forms part of the full List of moths of Chile. Subfamilies are listed alphabetically.

Subfamily Cercophaninae
Cercophana frauenfeldi Felder, 1862
Cercophana venusta (Walker, 1856)
Microdulia mirabilis (Rotschild, 1895)
Neocercophana philippi Izquierdo, 1895

Subfamily Hemileucinae

Tribe Hemileucini
Adetomeris erythrops (Blanchard, 1852)
Adetomeris microphthalma (Izquierdo, 1895)
Cinommata bistrigata Butler, 1882
Ormiscodes amphinome (Fabricius, 1775)
Ormiscodes cognata Philippi, 1860
Ormiscodes nigrosignata Philippi, 1860
Ormiscodes penai Lemaire & Parra, 1995
Ormiscodes rufosignata (Blanchard, 1852)
Ormiscodes socialis socialis (Feisthamel, 1839)
Ormiscodes socialis grisea Ureta, 1957
Ormiscodes joiceyi (Draudt, 1930)

Tribe Polythysanini
Polythysana cinerascens Phillipi, 1860
Polythysana rubrescens Blanchard, 1852

External links

Macrolepidópteros Heteróceros de Chile y de sus áreas adyacentes

.S
Chile
Moths, Saturniidae